Executive Order 9066 was a United States presidential executive order signed and issued during World War II by United States president Franklin D. Roosevelt on February 19, 1942. "This order authorized the force removal of all persons deemed a threat to national security from the West Coast to "relocation centers" further inland- resulting in the incarceration of Japanese Americans." Two-thirds of them were U.S. citizens, born and raised in the United States.

Notably, far more Americans of Asian descent were forcibly interned than Americans of European descent, both in total and as a share of their relative populations. Those relatively few German and Italian Americans who were sent to internment camps during the war were sent under the provisions of Presidential Proclamation 2526 and the Alien Enemy Act, part of the Alien and Sedition Act of 1798.

Transcript of Executive Order 9066
The text of Executive Order 9066 was as follows:

Exclusion under the order
On March 21, 1942, Roosevelt signed Public Law 77-503 (approved after only an hour of discussion in the Senate and thirty minutes in the House) in order to provide for the enforcement of his executive order. Authored by War Department official Karl Bendetsen — who would later be promoted to Director of the Wartime Civilian Control Administration and oversee the incarceration of Japanese Americans — the law made violations of military orders a misdemeanor punishable by up to $5,000 in fines and one year in prison.

Using a broad interpretation of EO 9066, Lieutenant General John L. DeWitt issued orders declaring certain areas of the western United States as zones of exclusion under the Executive Order. As a result, approximately 112,000 men, women, and children of Japanese ancestry were evicted from the West Coast of the continental United States and held in American relocation camps and other confinement sites across the country. EO 9066 was not applied in such a sweeping manner to persons of non-Japanese descent. Notably, in a 1943 letter, Attorney General Francis Biddle reminded Roosevelt that "You signed the original Executive Order permitting the exclusions so the Army could handle the Japs. It was never intended to apply to Italians and Germans."

Japanese Americans in Hawaii were not incarcerated in the same way, despite the attack on Pearl Harbor. Although the Japanese-American population in Hawaii was nearly 40% of the population of the territory, only a few thousand people were detained there. This fact supported the government's  eventual conclusion that the mass removal of ethnic Japanese from the West Coast was motivated by reasons other than "military necessity."

Japanese Americans and other Asians in the U.S. had suffered for decades from prejudice and racially motivated fears. Racially discriminatory laws prevented Asian Americans from owning land, voting, testifying against whites in court, and set up other restrictions. Additionally, the FBI, Office of Naval Intelligence and Military Intelligence Division had been conducting surveillance on Japanese-American communities in Hawaii and the continental U.S. from the early 1930s. In early 1941, President Roosevelt secretly commissioned a study to assess the possibility that Japanese Americans would pose a threat to U.S. security. The report, submitted one month before the Japanese bombing of Pearl Harbor, found that, "There will be no armed uprising of Japanese" in the United States. "For the most part," the Munson Report said, "the local Japanese are loyal to the United States or, at worst, hope that by remaining quiet they can avoid concentration camps or irresponsible mobs." A second investigation started in 1940, written by Naval Intelligence officer Kenneth Ringle and submitted in January 1942, likewise found no evidence of fifth column activity and urged against mass incarceration. Both were ignored by military and political leaders.

Over two-thirds of the people of Japanese ethnicity who were incarcerated — almost 70,000 — were American citizens. Many of the rest had lived in the country between 20 and 40 years. Most Japanese Americans, particularly the first generation born in the United States (the Nisei), identified as loyal to the United States of America. No Japanese-American citizen or Japanese national residing in the United States was ever found guilty of sabotage or espionage.

There were 10 of these internment camps across the country called “relocation centers”. There were two in Arkansas, two in Arizona, two in California, one in Idaho, one in Utah, one in Wyoming, and one in Colorado.

World War II camps under the order
Secretary of War Henry L. Stimson was responsible for assisting relocated people with transport, food, shelter, and other accommodations and delegated Colonel Karl Bendetsen to administer the removal of West Coast Japanese. Over the spring of 1942, General John L. DeWitt issued Western Defense Command orders for Japanese Americans to present themselves for removal. The "evacuees" were taken first to temporary assembly centers, requisitioned fairgrounds and horse racing tracks where living quarters were often converted livestock stalls. As construction on the more permanent and isolated War Relocation Authority camps was completed, the population was transferred by truck or train. These accommodations consisted of tar paper-walled frame buildings in parts of the country with bitter winters and often hot summers. The camps were guarded by armed soldiers and fenced with barbed wire (security measures not shown in published photographs of the camps). Camps held up to 18,000 people, and were small cities, with medical care, food, and education provided by the government. Adults were offered "camp jobs" with wages of $12 to $19 per month, and many camp services such as medical care and education were provided by the camp inmates themselves.

Termination, apology, and redress

In December 1944, President Roosevelt suspended Executive Order 9066, forced to do so by the Supreme Court decision Ex parte Endo. Detainees were released, often to resettlement facilities and temporary housing, and the camps were shut down by 1946.

In the years after the war, the interned Japanese Americans had to rebuild their lives after having suffered heavy personal losses. United States citizens and long-time residents who had been incarcerated lost their personal liberties; many also lost their homes, businesses, property, and savings. Individuals born in Japan were not allowed to become naturalized US citizens until after passage of the Immigration and Nationality Act of 1952.

On February 19, 1976, President Gerald Ford signed a proclamation formally terminating Executive Order 9066 and apologizing for the internment, stated: "We now know what we should have known then — not only was that evacuation wrong but Japanese-Americans were and are loyal Americans. On the battlefield and at home the names of Japanese-Americans have been and continue to be written in history for the sacrifices and the contributions they have made to the well-being and to the security of this, our common Nation."

In 1980, President Jimmy Carter signed legislation to create the Commission on Wartime Relocation and Internment of Civilians (CWRIC). The CWRIC was appointed to conduct an official governmental study of Executive Order 9066, related wartime orders, and their effects on Japanese Americans in the West and Alaska Natives in the Pribilof Islands.

In December 1982, the CWRIC issued its findings in Personal Justice Denied, concluding that the incarceration of Japanese Americans had not been justified by military necessity. The report determined that the decision to incarcerate was based on "race prejudice, war hysteria, and a failure of political leadership". The Commission recommended legislative remedies consisting of an official Government apology and redress payments of $20,000 to each of the survivors; a public education fund was set up to help ensure that this would not happen again.

On August 10, 1988, the Civil Liberties Act of 1988, based on the CWRIC recommendations, was signed into law by Ronald Reagan. On November 21, 1989, George H. W. Bush signed an appropriation bill authorizing payments to be paid out between 1990 and 1998. In 1990, surviving internees began to receive individual redress payments and a letter of apology. This bill applied to the Japanese Americans and to members of the Aleut people inhabiting the strategic Aleutian islands in Alaska who had also been relocated.

Legacy
February 19, the anniversary of the signing of Executive Order 9066, is now the Day of Remembrance, an annual commemoration of the unjust incarceration of the Japanese-American community.

In 2017, the Smithsonian launched an exhibit about these events with artwork by Roger Shimomura. It provides context and interprets the treatment of Japanese Americans during World War II.

In Feb. 2022, for the 80th anniversary of the signing of the order, supporters lobbied to pass the Amache National Historic Site Act historical designation for the Granada War Relocation Center in Colorado.

See also
Bob Emmett Fletcher
Fred Korematsu Day
Executive Order 9102
War Relocation Authority
Hirabayashi v. United States
Korematsu v. United States
Ex parte Endo
Defence Regulation 18B
Manzanar
Japanese American service in World War II
Internment of Japanese Canadians
Group Areas Act in South Africa
Population Registration Act, 1950 in South Africa
George Takei, Japanese American actor who was interned at one of the camps as a child and wrote a memoir about it called "They Called Us Enemy"

References

External links

Text of Executive Order No. 9066
Digital Copy of Signed Executive Order No. 9066
Instructional poster for San Francisco
Instructional poster for Los Angeles
German American Internment Coalition
FOITimes a resource for European American Internment of World War 2
"The War Relocation Centers of World War II: When Fear Was Stronger than Justice", a National Park Service Teaching with Historic Places (TwHP) lesson plan

9066
History of racial segregation in the United States
Legal history of the United States
1942 in American law
Internment of Japanese Americans
Civil detention in the United States
Political repression in the United States
Internment of German Americans